Villinger is a German surname.

People with the name include:

Alexander Villinger (born 1953), German composer
, (1889–1967), German sportsman and cinematograph
, (1860–1946), Swiss feminist
Walther Villiger, Swiss astronomer
Werner Villinger (1887–1961), psychiatrist